Fare Thee Well Love is the second studio album by Canadian folk music group The Rankin Family. The album was originally self-released by the siblings in 1990. It was re-issued by Capitol Records in 1992 and certified 5× Platinum by the CRIA.

Track listing
"Orangedale Whistle" (Jimmy Rankin) – 3:29
"An T-Each Ruadh (The Red Horse)" (Traditional) – 2:12
"Fair and Tender Ladies" (Traditional) – 4:02
"Fiddle Medley" (Dan R. MacDonald, John Morris Rankin, Traditional) – 3:45
"Fisherman's Son" (Jimmy Rankin) – 3:34
"Tell My Ma" (Traditional) – 2:18
"You Left a Flower" (Jimmy Rankin) – 3:27
"Fare Thee Well Love" (Jimmy Rankin) – 4:33
"Gillis Mountain" (Raylene Rankin) – 3:07
"Gaelic Medley" (Traditional) – 4:09
"Tripper's Jig" (Traditional) – 1:27

Chart performance

References

1990 albums
The Rankin Family albums
Capitol Records albums